Sture Sivertsen (born 16 April 1966) is a retired Norwegian cross-country skier who competed during the 1990s. He represented Leirådal IL. He made his world cup debut in Örnsköldsvik in 1990, finishing eight. His first World Cup podium came at Oslo in 1991 where he came third in the 50 km while his final world cup podium came at Val di Fiemme in 1997, where he finished third in the 10 km. He became world champion in 10 km and in the 4 × 10 km relay at the 1993 FIS Nordic World Ski Championships. At the 1994 Winter Olympics in Lillehammer, he finished third in the 50 km. He also has one gold and one silver medal from the olympics in relay, silver from 1994 and gold from 1998. He has two additional world championship relay gold medals from 1995 and 1997

Cross-country skiing results
All results are sourced from the International Ski Federation (FIS).

Olympic Games
 3 medals – (1 gold, 1 silver, 1 bronze)

World Championships
 4 medals – (4 gold)

World Cup

Season standings

Individual podiums
1 victory
9 podiums

Team podiums
 7 victories 
 14 podiums 

Note:   Until the 1999 World Championships and the 1994 Olympics, World Championship and Olympic races were included in the World Cup scoring system.

References

External links 
 

Norwegian male cross-country skiers
1966 births
Living people
Olympic gold medalists for Norway
Olympic silver medalists for Norway
Olympic bronze medalists for Norway
Cross-country skiers at the 1994 Winter Olympics
Cross-country skiers at the 1998 Winter Olympics
Olympic cross-country skiers of Norway
Olympic medalists in cross-country skiing
FIS Nordic World Ski Championships medalists in cross-country skiing
Medalists at the 1998 Winter Olympics
Medalists at the 1994 Winter Olympics
People from Levanger
Sportspeople from Trøndelag